Small-bore refers to calibers with a diameter of .32 inches or smaller. It may also refer to small-bore rifle competition. The medium-bore refers to calibers with a diameter between .33 inches up to .39 inches and large-bore refers to calibers with a diameter of .40 inches or larger. Miniature bore historically referred to calibers of .22 inches or smaller. There is much variance in the use of the term small-bore which over the years has changed considerably with anything under .577 caliber considered small-bore prior to the mid-19th century.


Small-bore competition
Small-bore competition often refers to shooting competitions conducted with .22 Rimfire target rifles.

See also
 List of rifle cartridges
 Table of handgun and rifle cartridges

References 

 Historic small-bore Enfield, BSA and other Service, Training and Target rifles reference pages, with league competitions for such rifles

External links
 Small-bore rifle NRA rule book

Pistol and rifle cartridges